Hahella is a  Gram-negative, facultatively anaerobic genus of bacteria from the family of Hahellaceae.

References

Further reading 
 

Oceanospirillales
Bacteria genera